Who Killed the Cat? is a 1966 British crime film directed by Montgomery Tully and starring Mary Merrall, Ellen Pollock and Amy Dalby. It was based on the 1956 play Tabitha by Arnold Ridley and Mary Cathcart Borer.

Plot
Three elderly spinsters become amateur detectives when someone poisons their beloved cat. The three determine the cat was poisoned by their mean landlady and they decide to take revenge. They plan to murder the landlady, but fate takes a hand in matters.

Cast
 Mary Merrall - Janet Bowering
 Ellen Pollock - Ruth Prendergast
 Amy Dalby - Lavinia Goldsworthy
 Mervyn Johns - Henry Fawcett
 Vanda Godsell - Eleanor Trellington
 Conrad Phillips - Inspector Bruton
 Natasha Pyne - Mary Trellington
 Ronald Adam - Gregory
 Philip Brack - Police Sergeant Rawlings
 Inigo Jackson - Doctor Brentwood
 Joan Sanderson - Mrs Sandford
 Gregory Phillips - Peter Parsons

Critical reception
The Radio Times called it a "strange, dated mystery"; and TV Guide wrote "This little film has a strange premise, to say the least."

References

External links

1966 films
1966 crime films
Films directed by Montgomery Tully
British films based on plays
British crime films
1960s English-language films
1960s British films